Possession or Phroso is a 1922 British-French silent drama film directed by Louis Mercanton and starring Malvina Longfellow, Reginald Owen and Max Maxudian. It is based on the 1897 novel Phroso: A Romance by Anthony Hope.

Plot
As described in a film magazine, Lord Wheatley (Owen) purchases an island off Turkey and under Turkish rule. Upon arrival, he finds the natives bitterly opposed to his taking possession. They plan to install a young woman, Phroso (Longfellow), as dictator. Several fights occur between the islanders and Wheatley's servants. Mouraki Pacha (Maxudian) arrives and quells the natives, but covets Phroso. Wheatley rescues Phroso from Constantine Stephanopoulos (Capellani), who wants to marry her, but the Turkish governor threatens him with execution if he does not surrender her to him. They escape using a secret passageway but again fall into the Turkish ruler's clutches. However, an islander with a grievance against Mouraki Pacha stabs him and helps the pair to escape in their yacht.

Cast
 Malvina Longfellow as Phroso  
 Reginald Owen as Lord Wheatley  
 Max Maxudian as Mouraki Pacha 
 Paul Capellani as Constantine Stephanopoulos  
 Jeanne Desclos as Poupa Cassieri  
 Charles Vanel as Dimitri  
 Raoul Paoli as Kortes  
 Louis Monfils as Stephan 
 Harrison Brown 
 Paul Menant 
 Paul Numa

References

Bibliography
 Dayna Oscherwitz & MaryEllen Higgins. The A to Z of French Cinema. Scarecrow Press, 2009.

External links

1922 films
Films directed by Louis Mercanton
French silent feature films
British silent feature films
Films based on British novels
Films set in the Ottoman Empire
Films set on islands
Films set in the Mediterranean Sea
Films based on works by Anthony Hope
British black-and-white films
French black-and-white films
1922 drama films
British drama films
1920s British films
Silent drama films
1920s French films